This is a list of the Angola national football team results from 1976 to 1999.

1976

1977

1978

1979

1980

1981

1982

1983

1984

1985

1986

1987

1988

1989

1990

1992

1993

1994

1995

1996

1997

1998

1999

References 

Angola national football team
Angola national football team results